The Complete Studio Recordings of The Miles Davis Quintet 1965–1968 is a box set of six CDs covering the work of Miles Davis and his critically acclaimed second great quintet which featured Wayne Shorter, Herbie Hancock, Ron Carter and Tony Williams.

The box set includes all songs from the albums E.S.P., Miles Smiles, Nefertiti, Miles in the Sky, the quintet tracks from Sorcerer, Filles de Kilimanjaro, and Water Babies as well as some rehearsal and alternative takes. The track list is sequenced in chronological order with the alternative takes preceding the final album version. A few of the tracks were previously unissued.

Track listing

Disc 1

Disc 2

Disc 3

Disc 4

Disc 5

Disc 6

Personnel

The Miles Davis Quintet
 Miles Davis - trumpet, chimes on "Circle in the Round" and "Water on the Pond"
 Wayne Shorter - tenor saxophone
 Herbie Hancock – piano; celeste on "Circle in the Round"; Wurlitzer electric piano on "Water on the Pond"; electric harpsichord on "Water on the Pond" and "Fun"; Fender Rhodes electric piano on "Stuff", "Petits Machins", "Tout de Suite" (both takes) and "Filles de Kilimanjaro"
 Ron Carter – double bass except on "Limbo (Alternate Take)"; electric bass on "Stuff", "Petits Machins", "Tout de Suite" (both takes) and "Filles de Kilimanjaro"
 Tony Williams – drums

Additional musicians
 Buster Williams - double bass on "Limbo (Alternate Take)"
 Joe Beck – guitar on "Circle in the Round", "Water on the Pond"
 Bucky Pizzarelli – guitar on "Fun"
 George Benson – guitar on "Paraphernalia", "I Have a Dream (rehearsal)", "Sanctuary", "Side Car II"

References

Miles Davis compilation albums
1998 compilation albums
Albums recorded at CBS 30th Street Studio